NeXTdimension (ND) was an accelerated 32-bit color board manufactured and sold by NeXT from 1991 that gave the NeXTcube color capabilities with PostScript planned. The NeXTBus (NuBus-like) card was a full size card for the NeXTcube, filling one of four slots, another one being filled with the main board itself. The NeXTdimension featured S-Video input and output, RGB output, an Intel i860 64-bit RISC processor at 33 MHz for Postscript acceleration, 8 MB main memory (expandable to 64 MB via eight 72-pin SIMM slots) and 4 MB VRAM for a resolution of 1120x832 at 24-bit color plus 8-bit alpha channel.  An onboard C-Cube CL550 chip for MJPEG video compression was announced, but never shipped. A handful of engineering prototypes for the MJPEG daughterboard exist.

A stripped down Mach kernel was used as the operating system for the card. Due to the supporting processor, 32-bit color on the NeXTdimension was faster than 2-bit greyscale Display PostScript on the NeXTcube. Display PostScript never actually ran on the board so the Intel i860 never did much more than move blocks of color data around. The Motorola 68040 did the crunching and the board, while fast for its time, never lived up to the hype. Since the main board always included the greyscale video logic, each NeXTdimension allowed the simultaneous use of an additional monitor.

See also 
 NeXT character set
 NeXTcube

References

External links 
 www.vamp.org/next/ Site for ND owners, featuring ND mailing list, ND faq and more
 NeXTComputers.org
 NeXTdimensionBoard

NeXT
Graphics cards